Sir António Mota de Sousa Horta-Osório (born 28 January 1964) is a Portuguese-British banker, formerly group chief executive officer (CEO) of Lloyds Banking Group (2011-2021), who was chairman of Credit Suisse until 17 January 2022. 

Sir Antonio joined Credit Suisse in April 2021 following a series of scandals at the bank. He left the bank in January 2022 after alleged breaches of Covid quarantine rules while travelling in Europe.

Early life

Family 
António Mota de Sousa Horta-Osório was born in January 1964, in Lisbon, the eldest child of António Lino de Sousa Horta Osório, a lawyer and national table tennis champion, and Adélia Maria Mendonça Mota. His paternal grandfather is António de Sousa Horta Sarmento Osório, a lawyer, economist and politician, and his maternal grandfather is Carlos Cecílio Nunes Góis Mota, 29th president of the Sporting Clube de Portugal.

He has two sisters and one brother: Sofia Maria de Mendonça de Sousa Horta Osório (Lisbon, 23 May 1975), Inês Maria de Mendonça de Sousa Horta Osório (Lisbon, 25 September 1976) and Carlos Eduardo Mota de Sousa Horta Osório (Lisbon, 5 March 1978).

Education
Horta-Osório graduated in Management and Business Administration from the Catholic University of Portugal, Lisbon, in 1987. He received his MBA at INSEAD, in 1991, where he was awarded the Henry Ford II prize for the best student in that year. He attended an Advanced Management Program (AMP) at Harvard Business School in 2003.

Career

Early career 
In 1987 Horta-Osório joined Citibank in Portugal, where he became vice president and head of Capital Markets until 1990. During this period, he also taught at the Catholic University of Portugal, where he was an assistant professor, and a guest professor from 1992–1996. He was also a guest professor in the Superior Course of Banking Management at the Portuguese Bank Training Institute (IFB), from 1988 to 1994.

In 1991 he joined Goldman Sachs, working in their corporate finance division, in New York City and London, from 1991 to 1993. That year, he was invited by Emilio Botín and Ana Botín to join the Santander Group and set up Banco Santander de Negócios in Portugal (BSNP), of which he became CEO. From 1995 to 2003, he was president of the Association of Alumni of INSEAD in Portugal. In 1998 he became a member of the INSEAD Portuguese Council, and from 2003 to 2007 he was the chairman.

In 1997, Horta-Osório moved to Brazil, where he initiated Santander’s retail activities in the country, purchasing two retail banks and merging them into Banco Santander Brasil, of which he became CEO (1997–1999) and chairman (1997–2000). From December 1997, he also became the chairman of Banco Santander Portugal.  With the 1999–2000 agreement between António Champalimaud, the Santander Group and the Caixa Geral de Depósitos, the Santander Group became the owner of Banco Totta & Açores and Crédito Predial Português, adding these to Banco Santander de Negócios and Banco Santander Portugal. Following this, the Group changed its name to Banco Santander Totta.

In 2000, he became chief executive of Banco Santander Totta in Portugal. He also became executive vice president of Banco Santander in Spain and a member of its management committee. He joined Abbey National as a non-executive director in November 2004. In August 2006, he moved to the UK, and became CEO of Abbey and its successor Santander UK. In 2006, he became chairman of Santander Totta in Portugal. In 2008, he led the integration into the Santander Group of the British building societies Bradford & Bingley and Alliance & Leicester.

Horta-Osório was appointed as a non-executive director to the Court of the Bank of England in June 2009, relinquishing this position in February 2011, as he became CEO of Lloyds Banking Group on 1 March 2011. Horta-Osorio is currently a non-executive director of EXOR N.V., Fundação Champalimaud and Sociedade Francisco Manuel dos Santos in Portugal, a member of the Board of Stichting INPAR. He also serves on the Confederation of British Industry (CBI) President’s Committee and is Chairman of the Wallace Collection.

Lloyds Banking Group 
In January 2011 he joined Lloyds Banking Group as an executive director, becoming CEO on 1 March 2011.

In November 2011, he went on temporary leave due to exhaustion, which the Evening Standard called the most high-profile sick leave in the City. The following month, he announced that he was ready to return to work. In January 2012, he cited the impact that his leave of absence had on the company as the reason that he did not wish to receive a bonus for 2011, and said "As chief executive, I believe my bonus entitlement should reflect the performance of the group".

Under his leadership, the bank's financial performance was turned around. It returned to profitability, slimming down to focus on domestic lending and to meet tougher regulatory requirements on the amount of capital it holds. Lloyds started down the road to full private ownership, with the Government reducing its stake in September 2013 and March 2014 respectively. In 2014, Horta-Osório saw his pay increase more than 50 percent to £11.5m as Lloyds returned to profit. Lloyds completed its return to private ownership in May 2017 with c.£900m above the original stake being repaid to the government.

In the aftermath of the Brexit referendum, Horta-Osório sought to allay fears the bank would shift operations abroad as other UK banks had announced. He told Forbes, "We have no plans to move jobs to Luxembourg, or anywhere else in Europe, as a result of the UK’s decision to leave the European Union…But the nature of our business, and our UK focus, means the direct impact on our business is less compared to our peers".

In 2017, Lloyds' statutory profit increased by 24% to £5.3bn in the year and it paid out the largest dividend in its history (£2.3bn) including a share buyback of £1bn. It also completed the acquisition of MBNA (1 June) and announced the acquisition of Zurich's UK workplace pensions and savings business (12 October).

In July 2020 Horta-Osório announced that he would stand down as chief executive of Lloyds Banking Group by summer 2021.  Charlie Nunn, formerly of HSBC, was named as his successor. Horta-Osório left at the end of April 2021.

Credit Suisse 
In December 2020, Credit Suisse announced that, from April 2021, Horta-Osório would succeed Urs Rohner as its chairman. Rohner described himself as "extremely happy" with the appointment. Horta-Osório is the first non-Swiss chairman in the bank's history. It was reported that he would move to Switzerland to take up the role, which he began by purchasing Credit Suisse stock worth $1.2 million as a sign of confidence in the group. He resigned in January 2022 after an internal investigation into his breach of Covid rules in the UK and Switzerland, and was succeeded by Axel Lehmann.

Other activities
 Institute of International Finance (IFF), Member of the Board

Honours and awards
Horta-Osório was made a Commander of the Spanish Order of Civil Merit in August 1998. In October 1998, Brazil awarded him the Order of the Southern Cross.

In June 2009, he was awarded the Spanish title of Encomienda de Numero of Orden de Isabel la Catolica (Commander by Number of Order of Isabella the Catholic).

He was awarded honorary doctorates by the University of Edinburgh in June 2011, the University of Bath in July 2012, the University of Warwick in 2015 and the University of Birmingham in 2019. 

In June 2014, he was awarded the Order of Merit Grã-Cruz, the Portuguese highest order of civil merit.

Horta-Osório won Euromoney's award for best banker in 2013. In 2018 he was granted the Freedom of the City of London and in 2019 was a recipient of the Foreign Policy Association Medal, British American Business Corporate Citizenship Award and the INSEAD Alumni Achievement Award.

He was knighted in the 2021 Birthday Honours for services to financial services and voluntary services to mental healthcare and culture.

Personal life
Horta-Osório and his wife Ana have three children, and live in Chelsea, London. He is a keen scuba diver, and enjoys playing tennis and chess.

Horta-Osório supported the UK remaining in the European Union.

Controversies

In August 2016, Horta-Osório issued an apology in an email sent to the bank's 75,000 staff for reported transgressions in his personal life while travelling abroad. He clarified that there was no financial misdeed, as he paid all his expenses personally, and indicated that he did not intend to leave the group as a consequence. He wrote: "I deeply regret being the cause of so much adverse publicity and the damage that has been done to the group’s reputation." His actions were reported to have been in breach of a code of personal responsibility for Lloyds staff that he had introduced himself.

In December 2021, a preliminary investigation by Credit Suisse had found that Mr Horta-Osorio had breached Covid-19 rules. He attended the Wimbledon tennis finals in July 2021 at a time when the UK's Covid-19 restrictions required him to be in quarantine. Mr Horta-Osorio also breached Swiss Covid restrictions when, according to Reuters, he flew into the country on 28 November but left on 1 December 2020. Swiss rules meant he should have quarantined for 10 days upon his arrival.

Mental health philanthropy
Horta-Osório has been public in describing how restoring Lloyds Bank's fortunes "almost shattered" his mental health and he has become a prominent campaigner for employers to support their employees with mental health challenges and so shrug off its stigma.

At Lloyds he oversaw the training of thousands of mental health first aiders, while he and around 200 other senior executives underwent a 12-month “optimal leadership resilience programme”, devised with his psychiatrist, Dr Stephen Pereira. Since January 2017, Lloyds Banking Group’s partnership with Mental Health UK has raised £11m and enabled 14,000 volunteering hours and 40 support groups. The partnership also runs a Mental Health and Money Advice service.

Horta-Osório was also involved, with Prince William, in the launch of Mind’s Mental Health at Work “gateway” in 2018; and in Lloyds’ membership of the City Mental Health Alliance. He has been widely praised for his campaign against the workplace taboo surrounding mental health issues; Simon Blake OBE, chief executive of Mental Health First Aid (MHFA) England, described his openness about his own problems as “inspiring”.

In 2020, Lloyds Banking Group’s work to raise awareness of mental health earned it a Gold award in the Business Disability Forum’s Disability Standard.

Arts 
In 2015 Horta-Osório was made chairman of the highly regarded Wallace Collection, the most valuable private art collection ever bequeathed to the British nation. In 2019, during his tenure, the gallery eased its traditional “no loans” policy and began both to make and receive temporary loans of selected works – for example, lending Titian’s “Perseus and Andromeda” for the National Gallery’s 2020 exhibition, Titian: Love, Desire, Death. The collection’s director, Xavier Bray, hailed the change as a “revolution” which was “like bringing fresh air to the collection and just making it live again”. Horta-Osório’s chairmanship, a prime ministerial appointment, was renewed in 2019.

Horta-Osório is also a significant collector of Portuguese art, particularly works of art made under Portuguese patronage in maritime Asia from the 16th to the 18th century. The collection includes objects created in China, Japan and India (especially Gujarat), often in rare materials such as tortoiseshell, mother-of-pearl and ivory and rock crystal. It also features a number of early chess sets.

References

1964 births
Living people
Lloyds Banking Group people
People from Lisbon
Portuguese bankers
Portuguese emigrants to the United Kingdom
INSEAD alumni
Portuguese chief executives
Catholic University of Portugal alumni
20th-century Portuguese businesspeople
21st-century Portuguese businesspeople
Naturalised citizens of the United Kingdom
Knights Bachelor
British bankers